Strawberry Stadium is a 7,408-seat football/soccer stadium  in Hammond, Louisiana. It is home to the Southeastern Louisiana University Lions American football team. The stadium also hosts St. Thomas Aquinas Catholic High School football, previously hosted Hammond High School football, and has been the site of numerous play-off games involving other schools from Tangipahoa Parish.

History
The facility was constructed in 1937 as part of Franklin D. Roosevelt's WPA program under Project 1304. The steel and concrete structure was built to hold 8,500 spectators and included 36 dorm rooms to house 144 students. Additional facilities in the stadium include a social room, café, music rooms, a band room, and dressing rooms for several sports teams. "The stadium was completed in only 16 weeks, due in part to the eagerness of Governor Leche, who reputedly pulled workers from other government construction projects in the area to work on the stadium. Leche initially planned to name the stadium after himself, but it instead was decidedly named in honor of the local strawberry farmers. A plaque still remains on the north end of East Stadium in honor of governor Leche's contribution."

Renovations
A renovation completed prior to the 2008 football season added club seating, six luxury suites, each accommodating 15 fans, as well as 116 seats outside of the Victory Club. The renovation also increased the press box size. In addition, a new multilevel parking garage for 500 vehicles was constructed to the west of the stadium and connected to it.  

Before the 2012 season, new turf was installed after being used at the Mercedes-Benz Superdome.

Notable events
The 1975 Louisiana High School Athletic Association Class AAAA state championship game was contested at Strawberry Stadium. St. Augustine, New Orleans' all-black, all-male Catholic high school, won its first LHSAA championship by defeating Covington High 35–13.

See also
List of NCAA Division I FCS football stadiums

References

External links
Strawberry Stadium at Lionsports.net

College football venues
Southeastern Louisiana Lions football
American football venues in Louisiana
Lacrosse venues in Louisiana
Multi-purpose stadiums in the United States
Sports venues in Hammond, Louisiana
Sports venues completed in 1937
1937 establishments in Louisiana